Classic Soul Ballads is a 16-volume soul CD-set, released by Time–Life Records in 2005, featuring 264 songs from the 1960s through the 1990s. It was not sold in stores, but sold directly by Time–Life.

Also included in this collection was Body & Soul: The Duets.

Track listing

Disc 1 (Love Power - 1 of 2) 
Unless otherwise noted, Information is taken from Allmusic.com
 Sexual Healing - Marvin Gaye
 Power of Love/Love Power - Luther Vandross 
 Turn Off the Lights - Teddy Pendergrass 
 Shining Star - The Manhattans 
 After the Love Has Gone - Earth, Wind & Fire
 Baby Come to Me - Regina Belle 
 Don't Say Goodnight (It's Time for Love) (Parts 1 & 2) - The Isley Brothers
 Juicy Fruit - Mtume 
 Shake You Down - Gregory Abbott
 Me and Mrs. Jones - Billy Paul 
 How 'Bout Us - Champaign 
 Always and Forever - Heatwave 
 Betcha by Golly, Wow! - The Stylistics 
 Shower Me with Your Love - Surface 
 If You Don't Know Me By Now - Harold Melvin & the Blue Notes

Disc 2 (Love Power - 2 of 2) 
 Reasons - Earth, Wind & Fire 
 Lean on Me - Bill Withers 
 You'll Never Find Another Love Like Mine - Lou Rawls 
 Can You Stop the Rain - Peabo Bryson 
 Here and Now - Luther Vandross 
 Make It Like It Was - Regina Belle 
 Kiss and Say Goodbye - The Manhattans 
 Best of My Love  - The Emotions
 Have You Seen Her - The Chi-Lites 
 Caravan of Love - Isley Jasper Isley 
 Woman to Woman - Shirley Brown 
 Cowboys to Girls - The Intruders 
 Close Your Eyes - Peaches & Herb 
 Let Me Make Love to You - The O'Jays 
 When Will I See You Again - The Three Degrees

Disc 3 (Sweet Thing - 1 of 2) 
Unless Otherwise Noted, Information is taken from Allmusic.com
 Let's Get It On - Marvin Gaye
 Cruisin - Smokey Robinson 
 It's Ecstasy When You Lay Down Next to Me - Barry White 
 Just My Imagination (Running Away with Me) - The Temptations 
 Three Times a Lady - The Commodores 
 You Make Me Feel Brand New - The Stylistics 
 You Should Be Mine (The Woo Woo Song) - Jeffrey Osborne 
 I'll Make Love to You - Boyz II Men
 Save the Best for Last - Vanessa Williams 
 On My Own - Patti LaBelle and Michael McDonald 
 Love You Down - Ready for the World
 Get Here - Oleta Adams
 Joanna - Kool & the Gang 
 I Feel Good All Over - Stephanie Mills 
 Ooo Baby Baby - The Miracles

Disc 4 (Sweet Thing - 2 of 2) 
 Being with You - Smokey Robinson 
 Playing Your Game, Baby - Barry White 
 Distant Lover - Marvin Gaye 
 If Only You Knew - Patti LaBelle 
 I Believe in You and Me - The Four Tops 
 I'll Be Good to You - The Brothers Johnson
 Just to Be Close to You - Commodores 
 Special Lady - Ray, Goodman & Brown 
 Love Ballad - L.T.D. 
 Sweet Thing - Rufus & Chaka Khan 
 Float On - The Floaters 
 Stay in My Corner - The Dells
 In the Rain - The Dramatics 
 Hey There Lonely Girl - Eddie Holman 
 The Bells - The Originals

Disc 5 (Nite and Day - 1 of 2) 
Unless otherwise noted, Information is taken from Allmusic.com
 I've Been Loving You Too Long - Otis Redding 
 Oh Girl - The Chi-Lites
 Something He Can Feel - Aretha Franklin 
 I Keep Forgettin' (Every Time You're Near) - Michael McDonald 
 Through the Fire - Chaka Khan 
 Miss You Like Crazy - Natalie Cole 
 Let's Do It Again - The Staple Singers 
 Always - Atlantic Starr 
 What You Won't Do for Love - Bobby Caldwell 
 Giving You the Best That I Got - Anita Baker 
 If Ever You're in My Arms Again - Peabo Bryson 
 I'll Be Around - The Spinners 
 Sideshow - Blue Magic 
 Nite and Day - Al B. Sure! 
 Love Won't Let Me Wait - Major Harris

Disc 6 (Nite and Day - 2 of 2) 
 Close the Door - Teddy Pendergrass 
 Just the Two of Us - Grover Washington Jr. & Bill Withers 
 Rainy Night in Georgia - Brook Benton 
 Sweet Love - Anita Baker
 One in a Million You - Larry Graham 
 Until You Come Back to Me (That's What I'm Gonna Do) - Aretha Franklin
 Thin Line Between Love and Hate - The Persuaders 
 Baby I'm Yours - Barbara Lewis 
 (If Loving You Is Wrong) I Don't Want to Be Right - Luther Ingram 
 Love on a Two-Way Street - The Moments 
 Pillow Talk - Sylvia 
 Hypnotized - Linda Jones 
 Baby, Come to Me - Patti Austin & James Ingram 
 Natural High - Bloodstone 
 When a Man Loves a Woman - Percy Sledge

Disc 7 (Lovin' You - 1 of 2) 
Unless otherwise noted, Information is taken from Allmusic.com
 Midnight Train to Georgia - Gladys Knight & the Pips 
 Any Love - Luther Vandross 
 La-La (Means I Love You) - The Delfonics 
 I Like the Way (The Kissing Game) - Hi-Five 
 I'll Never Love This Way Again - Dionne Warwick 
 Groove Me - King Floyd 
 You Are My Starship - Norman Connors 
 Everybody Plays the Fool - The Main Ingredient 
 Going in Circles - The Friends of Distinction 
 Do What You Do - Jermaine Jackson 
 I Do Love You - GQ 
 Dream Merchant - The New Birth
 Best Thing That Ever Happened to Me - Gladys Knight & the Pips
 I'm Your Puppet - James & Bobby Purify 
 Didn't I (Blow Your Mind This Time) - The Delfonics

Disc 8 (Lovin' You - 2 of 2) 
 Rock Me Tonight (For Old Times Sake) - Freddie Jackson 
 Let's Stay Together - Al Green 
 Misty Blue - Dorothy Moore 
 Come Go with Me - Teddy Pendergrass 
 I've Got Love on My Mind - Natalie Cole 
 She's Gone - Tavares 
 Tell It Like It Is - Aaron Neville
 Lady - The Whispers 
 Lovin' You - Minnie Riperton 
 That's the Way I Feel About Cha - Bobby Womack 
 It's You That I Need - Enchantment 
 I'm So Into You - Peabo Bryson 
 You Are My Lady - Freddie Jackson 
 L-O-V-E (Love) - Al Green 
 Sukiyaki - A Taste of Honey

Disc 9 (One Heartbeat) 
 If I Were Your Woman - Gladys Knight
 One Heartbeat - Smokey Robinson
 Cherish - Kool and the Gang
 Masterpiece - The Temptations
 Til Tomorrow - Marvin Gaye
 Piano in the Dark - Brenda Russell
 We're Going All the way - Jefferey Osborne
 You Are Everything - The Stylistics
 The Sweetest Days - Vanessa Williams
 Anniversary - Tony! Toni! Tone!
 You Don't Have to Cry - Rene and Angela
 Sensitivity - Ralph Tresvant
 When Love Calls - Atlantic Starr
 Breakin' My Heart (Pretty Brown Eyes) - Mint Condition
 Heaven - Solo

Disc 10 (Too Hot) 
 Love Overboard - Gladys Knight and the Pips
 On Bended Knee - Boyz II Men
 My, My, My - Johnny Gill
 I Feel Good All Over - Stephanie Mills
 Too Hot - Kool and the Gang
 All This Love - DeBarge
 Outstanding - The Gap Band
 Lady You Are - One Way
 Ooo La La La - Teena Marie
 Anytime - Brian McKnight
 You Got It All - The Jets
 Tonight - Ready for the World
 Everything - Jody Watley
 Your Smile - Rene and Angela
 I Miss You - Klymaxx

Disc 11 (Quiet Storm) 
 I Want You - Marvin Gaye
 Quiet Storm - Smokey Robinson
 Take My Heart (You Can Have it If You Want It) - Kool and the Gang
 Still - The Commodores
 Don't Look Any Further - Dennis Edwards & Siedah Garrett
 Secret Lovers - Atlantic Starr
 Back at One - Brian McKnight
 Dreamin' - Vanessa Williams
 All My Life - K-Ci & JoJo
 Water Runs Dry - Boyz II Men 
 Sparkle - Cameo
 Time Will Reveal - DeBarge
 If I Ever Fall in Love - Shai
 I'm In Love - Joe
 What Kind of Man Would I Be - Mint Condition

Disc 12 (In the Heart) 
 Sweet Love - The Commodores
 After the Dance - Marvin Gaye
 Hey Girl (I Like Your Style) - The Temptations
 In the Heart - Kool and the Gang
 I Wish He Didn't Trust Me So Much - Bobby Womack
 There'll Never Be - Switch
 Slow Motion - Gerald Alston
 Tell Me It's Real - K-Ci & JoJo
 The Agony and the Ecstasy - Smokey Robinson
 Yearning for Your Love - The Gap Band
 Strawberry Letter #23 - The Brothers Johnson
 Hollywood - Rufus & Chaka Khan
 You Can't Turn Me Off (In the Middle of Turning Me On) - High Inergy
 Love Makes Things Happen - Pebbles
 Oh Honey - Delegation

Disc 13 (Feel the Fire) 
 Feel the Fire - Peabo Bryson
 Solid - Ashford and Simpson
 Come Go with Me - Teddy Pendergrass
 Love, Need and Want You - Patti LaBelle
 I'm Still in Love With You - Al Green
 Our Love - Natalie Cole
 Never Had A Love Like This Before - Tavares
 Ready or Not - After 7
 Gloria - Enchantment
 Close to You - Maxi Priest
 Slow Jam - Midnight Star
 Keep on Movin' - Soul II Soul & Caron Wheeler
 Human - The Human League
 Is it Good to You - The Whispers
 Stairway to Heaven - The O'Jays

Disc 14 (Tender Love) 
 Giving Him Something He Can Feel - En Vogue
 Angel - Aretha Franklin
 It Is Still Good to Ya - Ashford and Simpson
 Love On A Two Way Street - Stacy Lattisaw
 Casanova - LeVert
 Just Be My Lady - Larry Graham
 Got To Be There - Chaka Khan
 You Were Meant for Me - Donny Hathaway
 Can We Talk - Tevin Campbell
 Tender Love - Force MD's
 I Want To Be Your Man - Roger
 Don't Walk Away - Jade
 As We Lay - Shirley Murdock
 Don't Disturb This Groove - The System
 Superwoman - Karyn White

Disc 15 (Between the Sheets) 
 Any Love - Luther Vandross
 Closer than Close - Peabo Bryson
 That's the Way of the World - Earth, Wind and Fire
 So I Can Love You - The Emotions
 Between the Sheets - The Isley Brothers
 If This World Were Mine - Cheryl Lynn & Luther Vandross
 Lovely Day - Bill Withers
 Free - Deniece Williams
 The First Time - Surface
 Someone to Hold - Trey Lorenz
 Thanks For My Child - Cheryl Pepsii Riley
 Sign Your Name - Terence Trent D'Arby
 You, Me and He - Mtume
 All Cried Out - Lisa Lisa and Cult Jam & Full Force
 Try Again - Champaign

Disc 16 (Show Me) 
 Show Me - Glenn Jones
 A Woman Needs Love - Ray Parker Jr. and Raydio
 Suddenly - Billy Ocean
 Love Power - Dionne Warwick & Jeffrey Osborne
 I Can't Want Another Minute - Hi-Five
 United Together - Aretha Franklin
 Weak - SWV
 Nobody Knows - The Tony Rich Project
 This Time I'll Be Sweeter - Angela Bofill
 Your Body's Callin' - R. Kelly
 All Woman - Lisa Stansfield
 Love Changes - Kashif & Meli'sa Morgan
 Sitting in the Park - GQ
 Seven Whole Days - Toni Braxton
 Sweet Lady - Tyrese

References

External links 
 Information at Time-Life Music & Video

2005 compilation albums
Soul compilation albums
Time–Life albums